The 2016–17 season is the 24th season of competitive football in the Czech Republic.

Promotion and relegation

Pre–season

Post–season

National Teams

Czech Republic national football team

2018 FIFA World Cup qualifying

2018 FIFA World Cup qualifying UEFA Group C

Friendly matches

Czech Republic women's national football team

UEFA Women's Euro 2017 qualifying

Cyprus Women's Cup

Friendly matches

League season

Men

Czech First League

Standings

Czech National Football League

Standings

Women

Czech First Division

Czech First Division Standings

Regular Season

Championship Round

League table

Relegation Group

League table

Czech clubs in Europe

UEFA Champions League

Third qualifying round

|-

|}

Play-off round

|-

|}

UEFA Europa League

Second qualifying round

|}

Third qualifying round

|}

Group stage

Group E

Group J

Group K

Knockout phase

Round of 32

|}

UEFA Women's Champions League

Round of 32

|}

Round of 16

References

 
C
C